The following list of people and animals from Thomas & Friends describes the more notable people and animals that have appeared in the television series Thomas & Friends (along with The Railway Series books). The series features many fictional people and animals, including train drivers, footplate crews, workers and signalmen, who interact with the railway engine and vehicle characters and form the basis for many of the varying storylines.

Major and recurring characters

Sir Topham Hatt/The Fat Controller

Sir Topham Hatt (also known as "The Fat Controller") is the controller of the North Western Railway on the island of Sodor. He sometimes works on the steam engines himself, and as a young man he drove a steam-powered lorry named Elizabeth. Perceptive and shrewd, he has used elaborate schemes to get to the bottom of a problem. His catchphrases are "You are a really useful engine." when he is proud of his engines and "You have caused confusion and delay!" when one of his engines messes up on something. He also scolds his engines.

Lady Hatt
Lady Hatt is married to Sir Topham Hatt. Although her husband runs a railway, she likes a day out on a boat or in their car.

Stephen and Bridget Hatt
Stephen Hatt and Bridget Hatt live on Sodor and regularly spend holidays with their grandparents, the Fat Controller and Lady Hatt. They spent a long holiday on Toby's old line. Stephen Hatt was excited when he first met Toby, but Bridget Hatt accidentally offended him by assuming he was an electric tram. Some time later, after Toby came to Sir Topham Hatt's railway, the family traveled with Toby to an old castle and mine on a map the children found.

Farmer Finney
Farmer Finney is the driver of Terence the Tractor. He owns a battery farm near Hackenbeck. His name was revealed in the 1996 annual story "James Gets Cracking". He first speaks in the season 21 episode "Terence Breaks the Ice". His CGI model is retooled from the stout member of the Sodor Brass Band.

Mrs. Kyndley
Mrs. Kyndley is an elderly lady who lives near Thomas' Branch Line. While she was bedridden, an avalanche blocked the railway line by her house. By hanging a bright red dress from her window, she successfully stopped Thomas' train before it crashed. As a token of gratitude, Sir Topham Hatt paid for Mrs Kyndley to visit Bournemouth to get better. Years later, the other engines, hearing Thomas' story, wished to express thanks to Mrs Kyndley for helping the railway, and threw her a Christmas party at Tidmouth Sheds. Percy's crew helped to gather a good luck package for her daughter's wedding: Old Slow Coach (something old), a new set of buffers (something new), a flatbed (something borrowed), and Thomas (something blue). Once when her sister was unable to make a visit, Sir Topham Hatt went to great lengths to cheer Mrs. Kyndley up. She had a ride with Harold the Helicopter, then was taken by James to open the grounds at Harry Topper's Fair.

Jem Cole
Jem Cole is Trevor's driver, and helped save him from scrap when Edward found him. Jem Cole also does other mechanical work on Sodor, also restoring Elizabeth and the Refreshment Lady's Teashop. Jem Cole has a love for old vehicles, and was a member of the party that went to rescue a lost engine called Duke. He was one of Rheneas' passengers in a famous night that saved the narrow gauge railway. His goat once caused delay for Percy, but ended up saving Maithwaite Station from a group of vandals. Jem's last mention by name was in series 7, in which he wore a suit and a derby, unlike his original, utilitarian look. He wasn't named again until season 20's "Three Steam Engines Gruff".

The Vicar of Wellsworth
The Reverend is a vicar who lives at the Vicarage near Edward's Branch Line. When Trevor the Traction Engine was facing scrap, Edward and his crew pleaded to The Vicar for help. After a demonstration, The Vicar was able to purchase Trevor for an agreeable price, and gave him a new home at the Vicarage orchard. The Vicar regularly holds Sunday School outings, fetes, and garden parties. He often employs Jem Cole and Trevor to give rides at such holidays. He keeps bees in the orchard and gives some of the honey to his friends. One time their hive broke while en route, and became a nuisance to James and his crew until they could return them to the orchard. The Vicar dresses in black with a wide-brim hat. In The Railway Series, the character of The Vicar appears in the books Edward the Blue Engine and Thomas and the Twins.

Farmer Trotter
Farmer Trotter is the owner of a pig farm. He also has sheep and bees. Farmer Trotter is good friends with Farmer McColl. He was one of the men that found Duke in series 4. His first speaking role was in series 7. Farmer Trotter has appeared in season 3 through 8, 10 through 14, 16 and 19. He was also mentioned in series 15 and 21, and has cameos in some films.

The Refreshment Lady
The Refreshment Lady sells tea and other refreshments to passengers on the Narrow Gauge Railway. She owns a shop at the bay called "Neptune's Refreshments". She was almost left behind once when Peter Sam rushed to the junction. She was angry at first, but forgiving when she learned that Henry had goaded him into rushing. Later, Peter Sam helped the Refreshment Lady to set up a new, mobile shop by restoring an old, disused coach.

Nancy
Nancy is a guard's daughter.

Tom Tipper
Tom Tipper is a postman.

Dowager Hatt
Dowager Hatt is Sir Topham Hatt's elderly mother, Lady Hatt's mother-in-law and Stephen and Bridget's great-grandmother, who had visited Sodor many times. On one visit, after a string of technical problems on the railway, her Dalmatian became frightened and ran away, spending a work day inside Thomas' cab. She decides after the incident to call him "Gremlin," for all the errors that had happened that day. Since series 13, Dowager Hatt appears to live on Sodor. She was first seen in series 5, and has appeared in most seasons of the series ever since. She also appeared in Day of the Diesels and cameoed in Sodor's Legend of the Lost Treasure and The Great Race. A portrait of her appeared in The Adventure Begins.

Old Bailey
Old Bailey is a fogman.

Jenny Packard
Jenny Packard (affectionally known as Miss Jenny) is an Irish woman who is the owner and leader of the Sodor Construction Company. She often works closely with the railways and her machines, "The Pack," are friendly towards the railway. She has a Land Rover.

The Foreman
The Foreman is Miss Jenny's second-in command and a member of the Sodor Construction Company.

Cyril
Cyril is a fogman who lives on Sodor in an old cottage in Misty Valley. When there is fog about, he puts detonators on the tracks to warn the engines about the fog. One time he was replaced by a foghorn, but saved the day when the foghorn caused a landslide, and made Thomas crash. Cyril was soon given the job back. He is the second fogman named in the TV series, after Old Bailey from series 5.

Farmer McColl
Farmer McColl lives and works on a farm in the countryside with many animals, including cows, chickens, sheep and pigs. Sometimes when there's bad weather on the island, he needs help from engines to keep his animals safe and healthy. Engines like Toby, Emily and Trevor have all helped Farmer McColl in some way for his animals. Once, Thomas the Tank Engine left a group of schoolchildren at his farm, and they spent the day learning about the animals. Farmer McColl was introduced in series 6.

Allicia Botti
Allicia Botti is a famous opera singer from Italy (a coloratura). Thomas is chosen to take her to perform at a concert. However, after finding a mouse inside Clarabel, she refuses to travel in the coach. She instead chooses Percy. Posters of her concerts are seen throughout the show.

Sodor Brass Band
The Sodor Brass Band are musicians who come to Sodor to perform. The engines transport them and enjoy their tunes, and they play wherever they are needed, such as Lady Hatt's birthday party. They also play music for the Sodor Circus. The Brass Band consists of 6 people, playing instruments like the trumpet, trombone, and the tuba.

The Duke and Duchess of Boxford
The Duke and Duchess of Boxford semi-regularly visit Sodor, and have their own private engine Spencer, who, on his first visit to Sodor, boasted to Gordon, but then ran out of water on Gordon's Hill. The Duke and Duchess later bought a holiday home on the Island, and had Edward take their furniture wagon, who beat Spencer to the house. The Duke and Duchess visit quite regularly to see the railway.

Lord Callan
Lord Callan is the Scottish-born lord (and owner) of Callan Castle and nearby surrounding land. He first appeared in series 7.

Mr. Percival/The Thin Controller
Mr Peregrine Percival (also known as "The Thin Controller") is the controller of the Skarloey Railway in the show. He is often found on his bike. In the US version, he is sometimes referred to as the Narrow Gauge Controller. Mr. Percival was introduced in series 9. In Series 10, he is featured with his unnamed wife.

The Mayor of Sodor
The Mayor of Sodor was first mentioned in series 7 and 8, before making his first appearance in series 9.

Sir Lowham Hatt
Sir Lowham Hatt is the Fat Controller's brother.

Mr. Bubbles
Mr. Bubbles is a clown famous for blowing very big bubbles and performing with very large balloons. Sometimes, during performances, he wears a hat that looks like a funnel Thomas once had to wear.

Sir Robert Norramby

Sir Robert Norramby is the Earl of Sodor and the owner of [[Railway engines Stephen, Millie, Glynn and Ulfstead Castle. His official title is Earl, although he is popularly called "The Duke of Sodor". In The Railway Series, he succeeded to the title as a boy after his father was killed in the Second World War. In The Island of Sodor: Its People, History and Railways he is termed Richard Robert Norramby. He opened the loop line to Lakeside on the Skarloey Railway. He returned to Sodor after traveling the world, to restore Ulfstead Castle and turn it into a visitor attraction.

Sailor John
Sailor John is Skiff's previous owner.

Captain Joe
Captain Joe is Skiff's present owner, and the lighthouse keeper at Arlesburgh Harbour, who made his debut in the series 20 episode "Blown Away". Following Sailor John's arrest, Captain Joe bought and now presently owns Skiff. In "Blown Away", he and Skiff once helped the residents of Arlesburgh to prepare for a storm.

Fergus Duncan/The Small Controller
Mr. Fergus Duncan (also known as "The Small Controller") is the controller of the 15-inch gauge Arlesdale Railway. He is taller than the Fat Controller and Mr. Percival.

The Thin Clergyman
The Thin Clergyman writes books. He is modeled after Wilbert Awdry. He first appeared in Sodor's Legend of the Lost Treasure.

The Fat Clergyman
The Fat Clergyman takes photographs. His first appearance was in series 20. He also appears in series 21 and is modeled after Edwin Boston.

Willie
Willie is a farmer (and tractor driver) who works on a farm, near the 15-inch gauge Arlesdale Railway.

Ruth
Ruth is an inventor who made her debut in Series 24, where she brings technology to the fair on Sodor.
 Dominique Moore (UK/US: Series 24 onwards)

DVD live action segments

Mr. Arkwright
Mr. Arkwright is an engine driver and a close assistant to the Fat Controller. Introduced in the 2009 video "Team Up with Thomas," Arkwright presents live-action segments between the stories in which he instructs viewers to help him in a project, such as creating an engine out of cardboard boxes for The Fat Controller's grandchildren. His office is located in the engine drivers' locker room at Knapford Station. Displayed inside the office are portraits of The Fat Controller and the engines.

Mr. Perkins
Mr. Gilbert Perkins (played by Ben Forster) is an engine driver who works on Sodor and is a good friend of Sir Topham Hatt. He has appeared in between stories on DVDs since 2010, showing the viewers how to make crafts like a cake that looks just like Thomas to dressing up to reading stories. In further appearances, he was shown reading Railway Series stories to the viewers and writing postcards in Mr Edwards' signal box. He hosted a version of Down at the Station titled Mr Perkins' Railway.

References

People and animals
Thomas and Friends
Thomas and Friends